In enzymology, a phenylalanine dehydrogenase is an enzyme that catalyzes the chemical reaction

L-phenylalanine + H2O + NAD+  phenylpyruvate + NH3 + NADH + H+

The 3 substrates of this enzyme are L-phenylalanine, H2O, and NAD+, whereas its 4 products are phenylpyruvate, NH3, NADH, and H+.

This enzyme belongs to the family of oxidoreductases, specifically those acting on the CH-NH2 group of donors with NAD+ or NADP+ as acceptor.  The systematic name of this enzyme class is L-phenylalanine:NAD+ oxidoreductase (deaminating). Other names in common use include L-phenylalanine dehydrogenase, and PHD.  This enzyme participates in phenylalanine metabolism and phenylalanine, tyrosine and tryptophan biosynthesis.

Structural studies

References

 
 

EC 1.4.1
NADH-dependent enzymes
Enzymes of known structure